The Encyclopedia of Imam Ali is a Persian encyclopedia about Imam Ali (the first Imam in Shia) studies that was published in 13 volumes. The editor-in-chief is Ali Akbar Rashad. This encyclopedia was published by the publishing organization of the "Islamic Research Institute for Culture and Thought".

Gallery

References 

Encyclopedias of Islam
Persian encyclopedias
Iranian books
Shia literature
Shia Islam